The One Man Band Broke Up is a solo studio album by American hip hop artist Ceschi. It was released on Fake Four Inc. and Equinox Records in 2010. It is a concept album about the rise and fall of a musician named Julius.

Critical reception

Brett Uddenberg of URB gave the album 4 stars out of 5, saying, "Ceschi brilliantly captures the beauty of the musician pouring his soul into his craft in spite of the transitory and often-unappreciated nature of such an existence." Chris Faraone of The Phoenix gave the album 4 stars out of 4 and called it "a triumph of triumphs." Joe Hemmerling of Tiny Mix Tapes gave the album 3.5 stars out of 5, commenting that "The One Man Band Broke Up isn't an easy listen, nor a uniformly enjoyable one, but if you've got the stomach for it, it will take you places that few other artists dare to tread." Thomas Quinlan of Exclaim! wrote, "The One Man Broke Up is an ambitious effort, but Ceschi succeeds in telling his story with great detail and atmosphere."

Track listing

Personnel
Credits adapted from liner notes.

 Ceschi – vocals, lyrics, production (4, 10), guitar (3, 4, 10), bass guitar (3, 4), synthesizer (3, 4), organ (3), banjo (4), ukulele (4), violin (10), glockenspiel (10)
 DJ Scientist – production (1–3, 5–9, 11–13), mixing
 Astronautalis – backing vocals (3)
 Max Heath – piano (4, 10), accordion (4, 10), steelpan (10), backing vocals (13)
 2econd Class Citizen – drum programming (5)
 Tommy V – backing vocals (6)
 Shoshin – vocals (8), lyrics (8)
 Mic King – vocals (8), lyrics (8)
 David Ramos – vocals (8), lyrics (8)
 Sole – vocals (11), lyrics (11)
 Ben Cooper – guitar (13), bass guitar (13), piano (13)
 Tom Filepp – backing vocals (13)
 Madelaine Johnston – backing vocals (13)
 Playpad Circus – mixing
 Jeff Smothers – mastering
 The Raincoat Man – artwork

References

External links
 

2010 albums
Concept albums
Fake Four Inc. albums
Hip hop albums by American artists